Jaanbaaz is an Bengali crime drama film directed by Anup Sengupta. This film was released on 25 October 2019 under the banner of Echo Entertainment Private Limited.

Plot
This is a love story of a gangster and an undercover lady cop. Bikram works for a gang of coal mafia in Dhanbad area but by heart he is a good man. He falls in love with a mysterious woman without knowing her true identities. She is an Indian Police Service officer deputed to destroy the coal mafia. The series starring Bonny Sengupta, Koushani Mukherjee, Tota Roychowdhury in the main roles.

Cast
 Bonny Sengupta as Bikram / Jeet
 Koushani Mukherjee as Priya Sarkar (Lady police officer) 
 Tota Roy Chowdhury as IPS Officer Abhijit Sarkar (Deceased) 
 Kanchana Moitra
 Kanchan Mullick
 Shankar Chakraborty as Rahim Bhai Garage Owner
 Biswajit Chakraborty
 Sudip Mukherjee as Shankar Singh
 Diganta Bagchi
 Koyeliya Lahiri as Item dancer

Soundtrack

References

2019 films
Bengali-language Indian films
2010s Bengali-language films
Indian crime drama films
2019 crime drama films
Films directed by Anup Sengupta